Canoe slalom (previously known as whitewater slalom) is a competitive sport with the aim to navigate a decked canoe or kayak through a course of hanging downstream or upstream gates on river rapids in the fastest time possible. It is one of the two kayak and canoeing disciplines at the Summer Olympics, and is referred to by the International Olympic Committee (IOC) as Canoe/Kayak Slalom. The other Olympic canoeing discipline is canoe sprint. Wildwater canoeing is a non-Olympic paddlesport.

History
Canoe slalom racing started in Switzerland in 1933, initially on a flatwater course. In 1946, the International Canoe Federation (ICF), which governs the sport, was formed. The first World Championships were held in 1949 in Switzerland. From 1949 to 1999, the championships were held every odd-numbered year and have been held annually in non-Summer Olympic years since 2002. Folding kayaks were used from 1949 to 1963; and in the early 1960s, boats were made of fiberglass and nylon. Boats were heavy, usually over 30 kilos (65 pounds). With the advent of kevlar and carbon fiber being used in the 1970s, the widths of the boats were reduced by the ICF, and the boats were reduced in volume to pass the gates, and boats have become much lighter and faster.

From 1949 to 1977, all World Championships were held in Europe. The first World Championship held in North America was held at Jonquière, in Québec, Canada, in 1979. It has been a regular Olympic sport since 1992.

Canoe double (C2) men lost its status as an Olympic event to be replaced by canoe single (C1) women, starting in 2021 at Tokyo.

Rules 
Each gate consists of two poles hanging from a wire strung across the river. There are 18-25 numbered gates in a course, of which 6 or 8 must be upstream gates, and they are colored as either green (downstream) or red (upstream), indicating the direction they must be negotiated. Upstream gates are typically placed in eddies, where the water is flat or moving slightly upstream; the paddler enters an eddy from the main current and paddles upstream through the gate. Downstream gates may also be placed in eddies, to increase the difficulty, and downstream gates in the current can be offset to alternating sides of the current, requiring rapid turns in fast-moving water.

Most slalom courses take 80 to 120 seconds to complete for the fastest paddlers. Depending on the level of competition, difficulty of the course, degree of water turbulence. and ability of the other paddlers, times can go up to 200 seconds.

In international competitions (World Championships, World Cups, World Ranking Races) all competitors complete a first run in the qualification round, called the "heats"; the fastest 20 to 30 boats make it through to the semi-final. The remaining competitors complete a second run, with a further 10 moving forward. The qualifying format is different for the Olympic Games, where each competitor completes two runs and the time of their faster run gives the qualification result. Depending on the number of participants in the event, 10 to 40 boats make it through to the semi-final; this consists of one run on a different course. The fastest semi-final boats, the number determined by the number of participants, make it through to the final, where they navigate the semi-final course once more. Their ranking within the final group is based on the time of that last run alone.

If the competitor's boat, paddle or body touches either pole of the gate, a time penalty of two seconds is added. If the competitor misses a gate (for the gate to be considered correctly negotiated, the whole head of the athlete (or all athletes) and at the same time a part of the boat must pass through the gate), deliberately pushes the gate to pass through, goes through the gate in the wrong direction or upside-down, or goes through it in the wrong order, a 50-second penalty is given. Only one penalty can be incurred on each gate, and this will be taken as the highest one.

There are currently four Olympic Medal events:
 C1 (canoe single) Men 
 C1 (canoe single) Women
 C2 (canoe double) Men (was dropped after 2016)
 K1 (kayak single) Men 
 K1 (kayak single) Women
 Kayak cross Men (to be added in 2024)
 Kayak cross Women (to be added in 2024)

In the 1960s and early 1970s, boats were made of heavy fiberglass and nylon. The boats were high volume and weighed over 30 pounds (14 kilos). In the early 1970s Kevlar was used and the boats became lighter as well as the volume of the boats was being reduced almost every year as new designs were made. A minimum boat weight was introduced to equalize competition when super light materials began to affect race results. The ICF also reduced the width of the boats in the early 1970s. The gates were hung about 10 cm above the water. When racers began making lower-volume boats, the gates were raised in response to fears that new boats would be of such low volume as to create a hazard to the paddler. Their low-volume sterns allow the boat to slice through the water in a quick turn, or "pivot".

Typically, new racing boats cost between $1,200 and $2,500 (or $850 onwards for the cheapest constructions in fiberglass). Usually boats are made with carbon fiber, Kevlar and fiberglass cloth, using epoxy or polyester resin to hold the layers together. Foam sandwich construction in between layers of carbon, Kevlar, or Aramid is another technique in use to increase the stiffness of slalom boats.

In 2005 the minimum length of these boats was reduced from 4 meters down to 3.5 meters, causing a flurry of new, faster boat designs which are able to navigate courses with more speed and precision. The shorter length also allows for easier navigation and less boat damage in the smaller manmade river beds that are prevalent in current elite competitions.

Boat design progression is rather limited year to year. Directly from the 2017 ICF Canoe Slalom Rules:

7.1.1 Measurements
All types of K1 Minimum length 3.50 m minimum width 0.60 m
All types of C1 Minimum length 3.50 m minimum width 0.60 m
All types of C2 Minimum length 4.10 m minimum width 0.75 m
7.1.2 Minimum Weight of Boats
(The minimum weight of the boat is determined when the boat is dry. The weight minimums were raised for 2017.)
All types of K1 . (Previously 8 kg).
All types of C1 . (Previously 8 kg).
All types of C2 .
7.1.3 All boats must have a minimum radius at each end of  horizontally and  vertically.
7.1.4 Rudders are prohibited on all boats
7.1.5 Boats must be designed to, and remain within, the required dimensions.
7.1.6 Kayaks are decked boats, which must be propelled by double-bladed paddles and inside which the competitors sit. Canoes are decked boats that must be propelled by single-bladed paddles and inside which the competitors kneel.

There are rules governing almost every aspect of slalom equipment used in major competition, including sponsor advertisement. Some of these rules vary from country to country; each national canoe and kayak governing body publishes its own variation of the rules.

Courses 

Slalom courses are usually on Class II - IV whitewater. Some courses are technical, containing many rocks. Others are on stretches containing fewer rocks and larger waves and holes.

Olympics
Slalom canoeing made its Olympic debut in 1972 in Augsburg, West Germany, for the Munich Games. It was not seen again until 1992 in La Seu d'Urgell as part of the 1992 Olympics in Barcelona, Spain. Since then, slalom paddling has been a regular Olympic event in the following locations:
 1972: Augsburg, West Germany 
 1992: La Seu d'Urgell, Spain 
 1996: Ocoee River, United States 
 2000: Penrith, Australia
 2004: Athens, Greece
 2008: Shunyi, Beijing, China
 2012: Lee Valley, UK
 2016: Rio de Janeiro, Brazil
 2020: Tokyo, Japan
 2024: Vaires-sur-Marne, Paris, France
 2028: Sepulveda Dam, Los Angeles, United States
 2032: TBA, Brisbane, Australia 

The 1972 Olympics in Augsburg were held on an artificial whitewater course. The Augsburg Eiskanal set the stage for the future of artificial course creation. With the exception of the altered river bed of the Ocoee River in 1996, every Olympic venue has been a manmade concrete channel. Since the late 1980s, artificial course creation has surged; now most countries that field Olympic slalom teams have more than one artificial course to train on. Artificial river creation has evolved and new courses have fewer issues than some of the initial designs.

See also 
Canoe Slalom World Cup
ICF Canoe Slalom World Championships
Canoeing at the Summer Olympics
Wildwater canoeing
List of artificial whitewater courses
Results Archive

References

External links
International Canoe Federation
International Slalom Rules
Latest ICF Slalom Results
Slalom: American Canoe Association
Canoe Slalom UK

 
Canoeing disciplines
Canoe slalom